The International Society of Electrochemistry (ISE) is a global scientific society founded in 1949. The Head Office of ISE is located now in Lausanne, Switzerland. ISE is a Member Organization of IUPAC. The Society has now more than 1900 Individual Members, 15 Corporate Members (Universities and non-profit research organizations from Belgium, Croatia, Finland, Germany, India, Italy, New Zealand, Poland, Spain, Switzerland and Serbia) and 16 Corporate Sustaining Members. ISE has also 8 Divisions and Regional Representatives.

ISE's objectives are:
 to advance electrochemical science and technology
 to disseminate scientific and technological knowledge
 to promote international cooperation in electrochemistry
 to maintain a high professional standard among its members.

See also
 Electrochemistry
 Quantum electrochemistry
 Revaz Dogonadze
 Rudolph A. Marcus

External links
International Society of Electrochemistry (ISE)
IUPAC

Electrochemistry
International scientific organizations